"Afterglow" is a song recorded by Tina Turner, written and produced by Terry Britten and Graham Lyle, and produced  by Britten. It appeared on her studio album Break Every Rule (1986), and featured Steve Winwood on keyboards. The song was the eighth and final song from the album to be released as a single, if only in the United States. It failed to crack the US Hot 100, but it reached number 5 on the US dance charts and number 20 on the Maxi Single Sales chart. A promo video for the track was filmed as part of the Break Every Rule TV special in 1986, in which it was the opening number. It shows Turner performing the song in her dressing room at the club Le Zero in Paris as she is preparing to go on stage.

Versions and remixes
 Album version – 4:39
 7" Remix
 Vocal Dance Mix – 7:10
 Glowing Dub – 6:14
 Tina's House Mix – 6:37
 Tinapella – 4:41

Personnel 
 Tina Turner – lead vocals 
 Nick Glennie-Smith – keyboards 
 Steve Winwood – synthesizer solo 
 Terry Britten – programming, guitars, bass 
 Jack Bruno – drums 
 Tessa Niles – backing vocals

Charts

References

Tina Turner songs
1987 songs
Songs written by Graham Lyle
Songs written by Terry Britten